Geostandards and Geoanalytical Research is a quarterly peer-reviewed scientific journal covering reference materials, analytical techniques, and data quality relevant to the chemical analysis of geological and environmental samples. The journal was established in 1977 as Geostandards Newsletter and modified its title in 2004. The editors-in-chief are Thomas C. Meisel, Jacinta Enzweiler, Mary F. Horan, Kathryn L. Linge, Christophe R. Quétel and Paul J. Sylvester. It is published by Wiley-Blackwell on behalf of the International Association of Geoanalysts. The journal is a hybrid open-access journal, publishing both subscription and open access articles.

Article types 
The journal publishes original research papers that include developments in analytical techniques, studies of geological-environmental reference materials, advances in statistical analysis of geoanalytical data, as well as data compilations, contributions to the characterisation of reference materials, as well as review articles and topical commentaries. It also publishes an annual bibliographic review article of the geoanalytical literature and a biennial series of critical reviews of analytical developments.

Abstracting and indexing 
The journal is abstracted and indexed in:
 Academic Search
 Aquatic Sciences & Fisheries Abstracts
 Chemical Abstracts Service
 Current Contents/Physical, Chemical & Earth Sciences
 GeoRef
 Science Citation Index
According to the Journal Citation Reports, the journal has a 2018 impact factor of 4.256, ranking it 11th out of 84 journals in the category "Geochemistry and Geophysics".

See also 
 List of chemistry journals
 List of scientific journals

References

External links 
 
  of the International Association of Geoanalysts

Geochemistry journals
English-language journals
Wiley-Blackwell academic journals
Quarterly journals
Publications established in 1977